Tomboy was a comic strip which originally appeared in Cor!! and also appeared in Buster.

The comic strip was about a girl who looked and acted like a boy, hence the name.  The plots mainly centred on typical problems which young boys would possibly find themselves in, only the twist was that it centred on a girl and not a boy.

Comic strips missing date information
Fleetway and IPC Comics
British comic strips